"Mind Your Manners" is a song by American indie hip hop duo Chiddy Bang, featuring Swedish electropop duo Icona Pop. It was released in the United States on July 19, 2011 as a digital download as the lead single from their debut studio album Breakfast. The song takes a sample of "Manners" from the Icona Pop's self-titled debut album. The song did not enter the Billboard Hot 100 but peaked on the Bubbling Under Hot 100 Singles chart at number 15, as well as reaching number 19 on the Top Heatseekers. The official remix features Gym Class Heroes frontman and rapper Travie McCoy. The single is featured in the soundtrack for the EA Sports video game Madden NFL 12.

Music video
On September 15, 2011, a music video of "Mind Your Manners" was uploaded on the duo's VEVO account on YouTube.

Track listing
Digital Download
"Mind Your Manners" (feat. Icona Pop) – 3:16
Official Remix
"Mind Your Manners" (feat. Travie McCoy & Icona Pop) – 3:58

Charts

Weekly charts

Year-end charts

Certifications

Release history

References

2011 singles
Icona Pop songs
I.R.S. Records singles
Virgin Records singles
Songs written by Sam Hollander
Song recordings produced by S*A*M and Sluggo
2011 songs
Songs written by Aino Jawo
Songs written by Caroline Hjelt